Paul Heathcote MBE is a chef, restaurateur and food consultant who spent two years under the guidance of Raymond Blanc at Le Manoir aux Quat' Saisons. He has appeared on many UK food television shows. 
Paul is one of only two chefs in the North West of England ever to hold two Michelin Stars, which he held at his Longridge restaurant. He sold the last of his restaurant group in 2015 and at one period owned 15 restaurants as well as an events and contract catering business. 
Heathcote is a triple Catey winner and previous winner of the Egon Roney Chef of the Year.
Heathcotes Outside catered for contracts at a number of sporting stadia including Liverpool Football Club, Preston North End, Warrington Rugby League, Sale Rugby Union Chester Race Course, and concerts Liverpool Echo Arena . The business was sold to Lindley in 2007 and he remained with the main board until its sale to Centerplate in 2013.  Paul has returned into event catering with Heathcote&Co. 
Heathcote&Co continue to hold a contract to cater  at Manchester International Festival MIF, the Macron Stadium home of Bolton Wanderers Football Club, 125 Bedroom Bolton Whites Hotel and workplace canteen Social Mess. 
Bolton Wanderers have been awarded gold for the best food and hospitality in any medium size stadium in the UK 2017 and third, bronze, in the country for 2017. Heathcote&Co had previously been awarded Silver in 2015 & 2016 by Stadium events and hospitality awards #SEHA .
He is the author of two books Rhubarb & Black Pudding and HeatHCOTE at home.

He hails from Bolton, Lancashire, and supports the town's football club, Bolton Wanderers.

Heathcote was appointed Member of the Order of the British Empire (MBE) in the 2009 Birthday Honours.

References

Living people
English chefs
Members of the Order of the British Empire
1961 births